Arend Donselaar "Don" Lubbers (born July 23, 1931) was president of Grand Valley State University (and predecessor Grand Valley State College) from 1969 to 2001. He was the second president of Grand Valley, serving after James Zumberge and before Mark Murray. He currently holds the title of President Emeritus. Most of the university's growth came during his tenure.

Early life
Lubbers graduated from Hope College, where his father Irwin Lubbers was president, and received his master's degree from Rutgers University in 1956.

He taught at Wittenberg University .

He served as president of Central College in Pella, Iowa, until he became Grand Valley's president.

Grand Valley State University
Lubbers became president of what was then Grand Valley State College at the age of 37, making him one of the nation's youngest university presidents.

The university expanded from a small cluster of colleges to Michigan's fastest growing university.

Lubbers Stadium on the Allendale Campus is named for him.

When he retired in 2001, Lubbers was the longest serving state university leader in the country.

References

Grand Valley History page
Retirement press release

Presidents of Grand Valley State University
Living people
1931 births
Central College (Iowa) people
Hope College alumni
Wittenberg University